Collins Township is a township in Story County, Iowa, USA.  As of the 2000 census, its population was 795.

Geography
According to the USGS, it contains two cemeteries: Collins Cemetery and Deeter Cemetery.

U.S. Route 65 runs north and south through the township and Iowa Hwy 210 runs west to Maxwell.

References
 USGS Geographic Names Information System (GNIS)

External links
 US-Counties.com
 City-Data.com

Townships in Story County, Iowa
Townships in Iowa